This is a list of mountains and mountain ranges in Turkmenistan:

 Arlan
 Aýrybaba
 Balkan Mountains – Great and Small Balkhan Ranges in Balkan Province, near the Caspian Sea
 Kopet Dag Range
 Köýtendag Range
 Mount Şahşah, also known as Mount Rizeh, the highest elevation of the Kopet Dag Range (2,912 m). 

 
Turkmenistan
Mountains